The 1970 Yale Bulldogs football team represented Yale University in the 1970 NCAA University Division football season.  The Bulldogs were led by sixth-year head coach Carmen Cozza, played their home games at the Yale Bowl and finished tied for second place in the Ivy League with a 5–2 record, 7–2 overall.

Schedule

References

Yale
Yale Bulldogs football seasons
Yale Bulldogs football